Acronis International GmbH, simply referred to as Acronis, is a Swiss technology company with its corporate headquarters in Schaffhausen, Switzerland and global headquarters in Singapore. Acronis develops on-premises and cloud software with unique integration of backup, disaster recovery, cybersecurity, and endpoint management. Acronis has 18 offices worldwide. Its R&D centers, Acronis Labs, are based in Bulgaria, the United States and Singapore. Acronis has 49 cloud data centers around the world, including the United States, France, Singapore, Japan, and Germany.

History
Acronis was founded by Serg Bell, Ilya Zubarev and Stanislav Protassov in 2001 as a separate business unit within SWsoft. In 2003, Acronis was spun off as a separate company. The company moved from a focus on disk partitioning and boot loader software to a focus on backup and disaster recovery software based on disk imaging technology.

In 2006, SWsoft partnered with Acronis to resell Acronis True Image Server for SWsoft Plesk 8.1 control panel software. The software is standalone and works with other control panels, which enables service providers to offer backup and recovery capabilities with dedicated hosting packages.

In September 2012, Acronis acquired GroupLogic, Inc., which allowed Acronis to integrate mobile devices, including Apple, into enterprise environments through acquisition of software that formed Acronis Access Advanced. The acquisition expanded Acronis’ data protection on mobile devices. GroupLogic gained access to Acronis’ customer base.

In May 2013, co-founder and Board Director, Serg Bell, returned as CEO after working on other ventures. In December that same year, Acronis announced the launch of an official research and development wing, Acronis Labs.

Acronis won the Mobility Product of the Year award at the Network Computing Awards in 2014.

The Global Partner Program through Acronis was launched in March 2015. The program gives partner companies access to the Acronis AnyData Engine. Also in 2015, Acronis won the ChannelPro Readers’ Choice Award for Best Backup and Disaster Recovery Vendor. In July 2015, Acronis announced a partnership with ProfitBrick to make Acronis Backup Cloud available for ProfitBrick's cloud computing platform. In 2019, it was announced that Acronis would sponsor the ROKiT Williams F1 Team and SportPesa Racing Point. Acronis was the Gold Stevie Award winner under the Awards for the Innovation in Technology Development category at the 2019 Asia-Pacific Stevie Awards.

In 2019, the company acquired 5nine Software, a cloud management and security company. In 2020, the company acquired endpoint Data Loss Prevention Vendor DeviceLock. Acronis chief officers (Steiner in 2019, Magdanurov in 2020) confirmed their plans to integrate the capabilities of both software product lines into the Acronis Cyber Cloud Solutions portal over time.

In July 2021, founder and CEO Serg Bell voluntarily stepped down from his role and was replaced by Patrick Pulvermueller, former president of GoDaddy. In October 2021, Acronis partnered with Addigy, provider of the cloud-based Apple device management platform, for its latest integration of Acronis Cyber Protect Cloud.

See also
Comparison of disk cloning software
List of disk cloning software
List of disk partitioning software

References

Technology companies established in 2001
Software companies of Switzerland
Companies of Singapore
Schaffhausen